The 1933 World Table Tennis Championships – Swaythling Cup (men's team) was the seventh edition of the men's team championship.  

Hungary won the gold medal with a perfect 10–0 match record. England and Austria tied for bronze.

Swaythling Cup final table

See also
List of World Table Tennis Championships medalists

References

-